Henicorhynchus ornatipinnis is a fresh water fish of the genus Henicorhynchus. It is found in the Mekong River.

References

Fish of Thailand
Henicorhynchus
Fish described in 1997